The 2006 CAF Champions League was the 42nd edition of the CAF Champions League, the Africa's premier club football tournament prize organized by the Confederation of African Football (CAF). It was started on 17 February 2006 with a preliminary round. Al Ahly of Egypt defeated CS Sfaxien of Tunisia in the final to win their fifth title and for the second time in a row with a late winner by Mohamed Aboutrika.
AlAhly keep the trophy forever after 3 cups

Qualifying rounds

Preliminary round

1 The tie between AS Port-Louis 2000 and Coin Nord was played over one leg only by mutual consent. 
2 Wallidan FC withdrew. 
3 CIVO United withdrew. 
4 CAPS United were later ejected from the competition. 
5 El Ahmedi withdrew.

First round

1 The match was abandoned at 9' of injury time in the first half with Hearts of Oak leading 2–0, after Saint-George SA walked off protesting the officiating. The tie was awarded to Hearts of Oak. 
2 CAPS United were ejected from the competition after 1st leg, when it was discovered that false information had been submitted for two Malawian players in their first round match against AS Inter Star. AS Inter Star were also re-instated.

Second round

Group stage

Group A

Group B

Knockout stage

Bracket

Semi-finals
The first legs were played on 29 September–1 October and the second legs on 14–15 October.

Final

Top goalscorers 
The top scorers from the 2006 CAF Champions League are as follows:

See also
2006 FIFA Club World Cup

External links
Official Site
Official MTN CAF Champions League Website
Champions' Cup 2006 - rsssf.com

 
CAF Champions League seasons
1